The Thomas J. Hankins House is a historic house in the crossroads hamlet of Sand Gap in far northern Pope County, Arkansas. It is a single-story wood-frame structure, with a gabled roof, novelty siding, and stone foundation. The roof, its gable end facing front, extends over the front porch, supported by square posts, and there is a square diamond window in the gable center. Built in 1929, it is good local example of vernacular Craftsman design.

The house was listed on the National Register of Historic Places in 2013.

See also
National Register of Historic Places listings in Pope County, Arkansas

References

Houses on the National Register of Historic Places in Arkansas
Houses completed in 1929
Houses in Pope County, Arkansas
1929 establishments in Arkansas
American Craftsman architecture in Arkansas